The Farabi International Award is given annually by the Iranian Ministry of Science, Research and Technology to individuals who have made outstanding contributions to humanities. Farabi Award winners become a member of Iran's National Elites Foundation.

Outstanding winners
Iraj Afshar
Fathollah Mojtabaei
 William Chittick
 Carl W. Ernst
 Hamid Algar
 Jafar Shahidi
 Gholamhossein Ebrahimi Dinani
 Pirouz Mojtahedzadeh
 Mostafa Mohaghegh Damad
 Charles-Henri de Fouchécour
 Michael Cook (historian)
 Richard N. Frye
Abouzar Fattahizadeh
 Gary Legenhausen
 Abdollah Javadi-Amoli
 Reza Davari Ardakani
 Mehdi Mohaghegh
Ahmad Samiei Gilani
Hamid Ahmadi (historian)
Mahdi Fadaei Mehrabani
Murtada Sharif 'Askari
Herman Landolt
Sadegh Ayenevand
Ezzatollah Fouladvand
Gholamhossein Mosaheb
Mohammad-Ali Eslami Nodooshan
Frank Hole
Javad Tabatabai

References

External links

Official website

 
Science and technology in Iran
Humanities awards
Iranian awards